Inermicosta is a genus of sea snails, marine gastropod mollusks in the family Muricidae, the murex snails or rock snails.

Species
Species within the genus Inermicosta include:

 Inermicosta inermicosta (Vokes, 1964)

References

Ocenebrinae
Monotypic gastropod genera